Rhabdodontomorpha is a clade of basal iguanodont dinosaurs. This group was named in 2016 in the context of the description, based on Spanish findings of an early member of the Rhabdodontidae. A cladistic analysis was conducted in which it was found that Muttaburrasaurus was the sister species of the Rhabdodontidae sensu Weishampel. Therefore, Paul-Emile Dieudonné, Thierry Tortosa, Fidel Torcida Fernández-Baldor, José Ignacio Canudo and Ignacio Díaz-Martínez defined Rhabdodontomorpha as a nodal clade: the group consisting of the last common ancestor of Rhabdodon priscus Matheron, 1869 and Muttaburrasaurus langdoni Bartholomai and Molnar, 1981; and all its descendants. Within the clade Zalmoxes and Mochlodon are also included. The clade is characterized by the following synapomorphies: 

 the outline of the dorsal iliac margin is sigmoidal in dorsal view, with the postacetabular process deflected medialward and the pre-acetabular process deflected laterally 
 the dorsal iliac margin is mediolaterally broader and swollen from above the ischiac peduncle anteriorly (present in Muttaburrasaurus) or above the postacetabular process all along (present in Zalmoxes spp.)
 the presence of a weak, dorsally convex ridge on the ventromedial side of their postacetabular process 
 the ischiac peduncle of the ilium is lenticular and uniquely anteroposteriorly long
 the acetabulum is noticeably low

The group consists of small to large plant eaters from Europe and Gondwana. It must have split from other iguanodont groups during the Middle Jurassic. In 2020, the Australian iguanodont Fostoria was also found to belong to this clade.

References

Iguanodonts
Aptian first appearances
Maastrichtian extinctions